NGC 2227 is a barred spiral galaxy with a morphological type of SB(rs)c located in the direction of the Canis Major constellation. It was discovered on January 27, 1835, by John Herschel.

In 1986, a type Ia supernova with an apparent magnitude of 14.0 was detected within NGC 2227, and was designated SN 1986O.

See also 

 Extragalactic astronomy
 List of galaxies
 New General Catalogue

References

External links 

 Catalog of NGC 2227
 NGC 2227 – SEDS.org (Revised NGC)
 Deep Sky Browser – NGC2227
 VizieR Service
 Aladin previewer – image
 Imagem de NGC2227 – SkyView

Barred spiral galaxies
Canis Major
2227
019030